John C. Hamer is an American-Canadian historian and mapmaker. His research has focused primarily on the history of the Latter Day Saint movement, authoring several books on the topic. Hamer is a leading expert on various schisms within especially non- far-Western (U.S.) portions of the Latter Day Saint "Restoration" movement. Raised in the Church of Jesus Christ of Latter-day Saints (LDS Church), Hamer left the religion before joining Community of Christ in 2010 and now serves as Pastor of its Toronto Congregation.

Hamer was a contributor to By Common Consent, the Restoration Studies Coordinator at Sunstone Education Foundation, and the Executive Director of the John Whitmer Historical Association.

Biography
Hamer's mother's ancestry goes back seven generations to the early Latter Day Saint church in 1833. His family history is connected to many variations of the (Latter Day Saint) Restoration (including Brighamites, Josephites, Rigdonites, Whitmerites, and Strangites).

Hamer was born in the suburbs of Chicago, and grew up in a suburb of Minneapolis. He was raised LDS — and very active as a Deacons Quorum President, Seminary Class President, Eagle Scout at 13 — but became a "closet doubter" as a teenager, and left organized religion altogether as an adult.  Uninterested in Mormonism, at age 26 he read No Man Knows My History, and commented that — ironically — Fawn Brodie rehabilitated Joseph Smith for him.

Hamer received a B.A. degree from Brigham Young University, and a master's from the University of Michigan.

Career

John Hamer was executive director of the John Whitmer Historical Association 2005–2009 and the Association's president 2010–2011. In 2007 Hamer was founding editor of the Association's imprint, John Whitmer Books. He also has produced maps for university presses and museums, including the University of Michigan Press, Columbia University Press, the Smithsonian Institution Press, the Strategic Air and Space Museum, and the Lewis and Clark National Historic Trail Interpretive Center. In Mormon studies, he has made maps for the LDS Church's Joseph Smith Papers Project, Herald Publishing House, Greg Kofford Books, the Journal of Mormon History, Mormon Historic Studies, the JWHA Journal, and Restoration Studies, among others.

On 6 April 2010, Hamer joined Community of Christ. He presently serves as pastor of its congregation in downtown Toronto, Ontario, Canada, and as a Historian for its Canada East Mission. He is President of the Sionito Group of Charities. Hamer is a founding editor at the group blog Saints Herald. Hamer helped found the Community of Christ ministry Latter-day Seekers as well as the on-line, inclusive pastoral gathering, Beyond the Walls. Hamer gives regular lectures at Centre Place (the Toronto congregation of Community of Christ) on the topics of history, theology, and philosophy. Over 100 of his lectures are available on the Centre Place YouTube channel. Semiweekly on weekdays, Hamer teaches sitting meditation from the Zen tradition.

Personal life
Hamer is married to Mike Karpowicz. They live in Toronto, Ontario.

Works

Books

Articles

Podcast appearances
Hamer has been a guest on many podcasts including Mormon Stories, Gay Mormon Stories, Mormon Sunday School, Project Zion Podcast, Feminist Mormon Housewives, Mormon Expression, Infants on Thrones, Mormon Expositor, Sunstone, Radio West, Back Story with the American History Guys, Interesting Canadian Mormons, Naked Mormonism, Rational Faiths, and Mormon Matters.

References

External links

John C. Hamer's Centre Place lectures on YouTube
 SaintsHerald.com/Columnists
 InfantsOnThrones.com/About
 MormonMatters.org/Author/John Hamer
 ByCommonConsent.com/John Hamer

1970 births
21st-century American essayists
American Latter Day Saint writers
American bloggers
American cartographers
American emigrants to Canada
American historians of religion
American leaders of the Community of Christ
American male bloggers
American male writers
American religion academics
Brigham Young University alumni
Canadian Latter Day Saint writers
Canadian Latter Day Saints
Canadian historians of religion
Canadian leaders of the Community of Christ
Canadian male non-fiction writers
Canadian religion academics
Canadian gay writers
Historians of the Latter Day Saint movement
LGBT Christian clergy
LGBT Latter Day Saints
LGBT historians
LGBT people from Illinois
LGBT people from Minnesota
Living people
Mormon studies scholars
People from Aurora, Illinois
People from Edina, Minnesota
University of Michigan alumni
Writers from Minnesota
Writers from Toronto
Historians from Illinois
American gay writers